Hypoplectrus is a genus of fishes commonly known as hamlets, found mainly in coral reefs in the Caribbean Sea and the Gulf of Mexico, particularly around Florida and the Bahamas. They are a popular choice for hobbyist saltwater aquariums, and come in a variety of colors.

Species
There are currently 17 recognized species in this genus:
 Hypoplectrus aberrans Poey, 1868 (Yellowbelly hamlet)
 Hypoplectrus atlahua Tavera & Acero P, 2013 (Jarocho hamlet) 
 Hypoplectrus castroaguirrei Del-Moral-Flores, J. L. Tello-Musi & J. A. Martínez-Pérez, 2012
 Hypoplectrus chlorurus G. Cuvier, 1828 (Yellowtail hamlet)
 Hypoplectrus ecosur Victor, 2012
 Hypoplectrus floridae Victor, 2012	 
 Hypoplectrus gemma Goode & T. H. Bean, 1882 (Blue hamlet)	 
 Hypoplectrus gummigutta Poey, 1851 (Golden hamlet)	 
 Hypoplectrus guttavarius Poey, 1852 (Shy hamlet)
 Hypoplectrus indigo Poey, 1851 (Indigo hamlet)	 
 Hypoplectrus maculiferus Poey, 1871 	
 Hypoplectrus maya Lobel, 2011 (Maya hamlet)
 Hypoplectrus nigricans Poey, 1852 (Black hamlet)
 Hypoplectrus providencianus Acero P & Garzón-Ferreira, 1994 (Masked hamlet)	 
 Hypoplectrus puella G. Cuvier, 1828 (Barred hamlet)
 Hypoplectrus randallorum Lobel, 2011 (Tan hamlet)
 Hypoplectrus unicolor Walbaum, 1792 (Butter hamlet)

Reproduction
Hamlets are simultaneous hermaphrodites (or synchronous hermaphrodites): They have both male and female sexual organs at the same time as an adult, meaning that they function as a male and female, making them one of the few vertebrates that are male and female at the same time. They seem quite at ease mating in front of divers, allowing observations in the wild to occur readily. They do not practice self-fertilization, but when they find a mate, the pair takes turns between which one acts as the male and which acts as the female through multiple matings, usually over the course of several nights. Hamlets preferentially mate with individuals of their same color pattern.

References

 
Serraninae
Fish of the Caribbean
Fauna of the Southeastern United States
Perciformes genera